Robert Edward Morrow (May 5, 1918 – July 9, 2003) was an American professional football player and coach.  He played as a fullback in the National Football League (NFL). Morrow was drafted in the 12th round of the 1941 NFL Draft by the Chicago Bears and played that season with the Chicago Cardinals. He played two more seasons with the team before spending a year away from the NFL. During the 1945 NFL season, he was a member of the New York Giants. The following season, he played with the New York Yankees.  Morrow served as the head football coach at his alma mater, Illinois Wesleyan University, from 1947 to 1950.

Head coaching record

References

External links
 
 

1918 births
2003 deaths
American football fullbacks
Camp Peary Pirates football players
Chicago Cardinals players
Illinois Wesleyan Titans football coaches
Illinois Wesleyan Titans football players
New York Giants players
New York Yankees (AAFC) players
Sportspeople from Madison, Wisconsin
Players of American football from Wisconsin